Tough is an EP by the rapper Kurtis Blow, released in 1982 on Mercury Records. It reached #38 on the Black Albums chart and #167 on the Pop Albums chart. The single "Tough" reached #37 on the Black Singles chart.

Critical reception

Music critic Carl Cooper placed Tough on his ballot for the 1982 Village Voice Pazz and Jop poll.

Track listing
"Tough" (5:50)
"Juice" (6:15)
"Daydreamin'" (4:25)
"Boogie Blues" (5:26)
"Baby You've Got to Go" (3:12)

References

1982 albums
Kurtis Blow albums
Mercury Records albums